The first season of Private Practice, an American television series created by Shonda Rhimes, consisted of nine episodes that ran from September 26 to December 5, 2007. A spin-off of Grey's Anatomy, the series tells the story of Addison Montgomery, a world-class neonatal surgeon, as she adjusts to her move from Seattle to Los Angeles and a new job at Oceanside Wellness Group, a private medical practice. The episodes also focus on the interpersonal relationships among Addison's co-workers, Naomi Bennett, Sam Bennett, Cooper Freedman, Dell Parker, Violet Turner and Pete Wilder, as well as St. Ambrose Hospital chief of staff Charlotte King.

Private Practice first season aired in the United States on Wednesdays at 9:00 pm ET on ABC, a terrestrial television network. The season garnered an average of 10.76 million viewers per episode during the 2008–09 American television season. In the United Kingdom, the season premiered on Living on July 15, 2008, and was subsequently shown on Tuesdays at 10:00 pm. It aired in Canada on CTV Television Network and in Australia on the Seven Network. It received generally negative reviews from television critics on its debut, but was nominated for three NAACP Image Awards and one People's Choice Award, and earned one BMI Film & TV Award. 

The season was released on DVD as a three-disc box set under the title of Private Practice: The Complete First Season – Extended Edition, on September 16, 2008, by Buena Vista Home Entertainment in Region 1 and on March 16, 2009, in Region 2. The season is also available for purchase by registered users at the U.S. iTunes Store, as well as numerous streaming video on demand services.

Episodes

Production

Development
On February 21, 2007, Edward Wyatt of The New York Times reported that ABC was in the process of developing a spin-off series from the medical drama television series Grey's Anatomy. Even though network executives and series creator Shonda Rhimes did not confirm plans for Private Practice, Wyatt called it a "well-known secret" as information about the casting and production was becoming increasingly more available. The spin-off was officially confirmed through subsequent media commentators, who stated that the two-part episode "The Other Side of This Life" would serve as the backdoor pilot for the new series. Grey's Anatomy cast members Ellen Pompeo and Katherine Heigl had mixed reactions to the decision to create a spin-off for Kate Walsh's character Addison Montgomery. Today's Jeannette Walls reported that Pompeo was angry at not being consulted prior the show's creation. Heigl praised the concept for Private Practice but wished her character (Izzie Stevens) had been chosen for the spin-off instead. 

The show was officially announced as part of ABC's 2007 fall television schedule on The Ellen DeGeneres Show. The season was produced by ABC Studios, the Mark Gordon Company, and ShondaLand. The executive producers were Rhimes, Betsy Beers, Marti Noxon, Mark Gordon, and Mark Tinker; Rhimes also served as the show's cinematographer. Production began on July 18, 2007, in Los Angeles. The series' theme and score were composed by Chad Fischer and Tim Bright.

Casting

The first season features a cast of eight actors who receive star billing. Kate Walsh stars as Dr. Addison Montgomery, a neonatologist who moved to Santa Monica in order to reinvent herself. Audra McDonald and Taye Diggs play the respective characters of fertility specialist Dr. Naomi Bennett and health guru Dr. Sam Bennett, Addison's divorcee college friends. The role of Naomi was originally played by Merrin Dungey in the backdoor pilot. According to a writer from Variety, network executives replaced her with McDonald due to concerns over the lack of chemistry between Dungey and Diggs. The recasting did not result in reshooting any of the pilot's previous scenes. Amy Brenneman is Dr. Violet Turner, a therapist who constantly doubts herself. Paul Adelstein portrays pediatrician Dr. Cooper Freedman, who is a sex addict. Tim Daly plays the seductive alternative medicine specialist, Dr. Pete Wilder, and Chris Lowell is the receptionist Dell Parker, who frequently appears shirtless in the office. 

KaDee Strickland portrays Dr. Charlotte King, who also works as a hospital administrator. Strickland's character was introduced in the first season and did not make an appearance in the backdoor pilot. Her addition to the main cast was announced on July 11, 2007, prior to the commencement of the first season. Strickland did not have to audition for the role, but was cast after a meeting with Rhimes.

Numerous supporting characters have been given expansive and recurring appearances in the progressive storylines. David Sutcliffe plays police officer Kevin Nelson, who was introduced as a love interest of Addison. Sutcliffe later appeared in 11 episodes in the second season. Geffri Maya Hightower plays Naomi and Sam's daughter, Maya Bennett. Hightower would return for future seasons, and was included in 30 episodes over the course of the series. James Pickens Jr. portrays Dr. Richard Webber, as a special guest star, appearing in the teaser sequence for the first episode.

Reception

Viewing figures
The pilot episode, which aired on September 26, 2007, garnered 14.1 million viewers, ranking number 13 in its time slot of Wednesdays at 9:00 pm Eastern Time Zone (ET) (8:00 pm Central Time Zone (Americas) [CT]). ABC picked up the series for a full 22-episode season on October 18, 2007, after it had aired four episodes. At the time of its renewal, Private Practice was the most-watched new drama of the 2007 television season. Overall, the first season averaged 10.76 million viewers for the nine episodes aired in the U.S., with the pilot being the highest rated episode. Of the regular prime time programming that aired during the 2007–08 American television season, Private Practice ranked 36 out of 225 programs, according to the Nielsen ratings.

Critical response
Private Practice received generally negative critical reviews when it was first broadcast. On the review aggregator website Metacritic, the first season scored 45 out of 100, based on 25 reviews, indicating "mixed to average" responses.  The series was called "shallow and smirky" by The Washington Posts Tom Shales, who felt the dialogue and storylines relied too much on sexual humor; he thought the first season would not appeal to Grey's Anatomy fans. David Hinckley of the New York Daily News was critical of the pilot's opening sequences, finding they represented the show too much as a sitcom, but felt that it found its footing as the episode progressed and more emphasis was placed on "the more nuanced personal and professional sides of its characters". David Zurawik of The Baltimore Sun praised Brenneman and McDonald's performances, but was disappointed in the series premiere.

Some critics commented negatively on the characters and the show's representation of women. The series was described as an improvement over the backdoor pilot by USA Todays Robert Blanco, but he criticized the doctors' characters as childish and seemingly incapable of doing their jobs. Blanco viewed the show as a misstep in Addison's character development, writing that she is "a woman who was once a tough, smart, flawed, sexy adult [who] has turned into a fluttering, indecisive sorority girl". Alessandra Stanley of The New York Times was critical of the show's interpretation of feminism, describing the characters as "one of the most depressing portrayals of the female condition since The Bell Jar", and reminiscent of the "seven stages of womanly despair" in William Hogarth's engraving A Surgeon's Progress. Dough Elfman of the Chicago Sun-Times wrote that the actors were better than the show's premise and writing, and The Boston Globe's Matthew Gilbert described the characters as a "stock cast of whiney healers" and the storylines as "hokey, gimmicky medical cases of the week".

Awards and nominations
The first season of Private Practice was nominated for three NAACP Image Awards—Outstanding Supporting Actor in a Drama Series (Diggs), Outstanding Supporting Actress in a Drama Series (McDonald), and Outstanding Writing in a Drama Series (Rhimes) for the pilot. The series received a nomination for the People's Choice Award for Favorite New TV Drama. Chad Fischer and Tim Bright won the BMI TV Music Award at the BMI Film & TV Awards.

DVD release

References

External links

Private Practice at ABC.com

2007 American television seasons
Private Practice (TV series) seasons